Lehigh High School can refer to more than one educational institution in the United States:

 Lehigh Senior High School, in Lehigh Acres, Florida
 Lehigh High School (Kansas), in Lehigh, Kansas, merged with Hillsboro High School (Kansas) in 1960s
 Northern Lehigh High School, in Slatington, Pennsylvania

See also
 Lehigh (disambiguation)